Oola Castle is a tower house located in County Limerick, Ireland.

Location

It should not be confused with the castle in Ballyneety nearby, which is sometimes called "Oola Castle."

History

The current building dates to the late 16th century and was built by the O'Briens. It is classified as a "later" tower house; according to Claire Foley and Colm Donnelly, "greater provision of heat and light, married to Renaissance concepts of symmetry, was incorporated into the traditional building form to create a new tower-house paradigm, as expressed at buildings such as Oola [Castle]."

In 1825, antlers of the Irish elk were discovered; and, in 1828, a bronze trumpet, spear and arrowheads of bronze were found. Both were placed in the museum of Trinity College, Dublin.

A local legend concerns a princess named Theresa who lived in the castle in the 18th century; she was very fond of oranges and was later forced to move to County Cavan for unclear reasons.

Castle

The castle is a square six-storey limestone tower house. There are circular bartizans on the northeast and southwest corners. The upper windows have hood moulding, and the east and west walls have their original fireplaces.

When it was in use, it would have had whitewashed walls, gables crowned with chimneys and mullioned windows.

References

Castles in County Limerick
Tower houses in the Republic of Ireland
Towers completed in the 16th century
16th-century establishments in Ireland